Majel may refer to:

People
 Majel Barrett (1932–2008), American actress and producer
 Majel Coleman (1903–1980), American film actress of the silent and early sound eras
 Majel Davidson (1885–1969), Scottish artist

Other uses
 Marshall Islands (native name M̧ajeļ)
 Google Majel or Google Now, an intelligent personal assistant